Aspergillic acid is an organic chemical compound with the molecular formula C12H20N2O2. It has a pale yellow crystalline appearance. Aspergillic acid is most commonly known as an antibiotic and antifungal agent that is derived from certain strains of the fungus Aspergillus flavus.

History 
In 1940 Edwin C. White and Justina H. Hill discovered that a fungal strain of  Aspergillus flavus growing in a surface culture on a tryptone-salt was capable of producing a bactericidal filtrate. It has also been shown to be a bactericidal for some Gram-negative as well as Gram-positive bacteria. Over the next few years they worked off this discovery and succeeded to isolate the active material in the crystalline form. In 1943 they managed to isolate this antibiotic compound and called it aspergillic acid primarily because of its origin and acidic properties. Scientists have since been working with the Asperigillus flavus strain to produce various types of antibacterial substances.

Structure
The structure of aspergillic acid was made by Dutcher and Spring and his co-workers. They suggested that it is a cyclic hydroxamic acid related to pyridine. It can be reduced to a neutral deoxyaspergillic acid, which is a racemization product found by Newbold, et al. to be identical with 3-isobutyl-6-sec-butyl-2-hydroxypyrazine. Because of this, aspergillic acid has been assigned the corresponding l-oxide or tautomeric pyridine hydroxamic acid structure show below.

Toxicity

The toxicity of aspergillic acid is controlled by the hydroxamic acid functionality, and there is little effect on toxicity observed between the differences in the 3 and 6 position side chain substituents. Chelation of physiologically important ions, such as calcium by aspergillic acid appears to be the likely mechanism of its toxic action.

Synthesis 
Different Aspergillus strains are capable of making various hydroxypyrazine derivatives. Aspergillus flavus is used to produce an antibiotic substance called flavacol. Flavacol is then added to cultures of A. selerotiorum and is N-hydroxylated into neoaspergillic acid. It is then hydroxylated in the side-chain in order to make neohydroxyaspergillic acid

Other studies show that aspergillic acid can also be derived from one molecule of L-leucine and one molecule of L-isoleucine in Aspergillus flavus.

Reactions
When aspergillic acid reactions with iron trichloride (FeCl3), there is the formation of green cupric salt. This suggests that aspergillic acid is a hydroxamic acid derivative, which is also confirmed by the formation of deoxyaspergillic acid by dry distillation with copper chromite catalyst.

Bromination of aspergillic acid followed by reduction with zinc and acetic acid gives a diketopiperazine. Hydrolysis with HBr yields a mixture of DL-leucine and DL-isoleucine. These reaction schemes can be seen below:

References

Antibiotics
Organic acids
Conjugated ketones
Pyrazines